The 2015–16 Senior Women's Football Championship was the 21st edition of Senior Women's National Football Championship, the women's state competition in Indian football. The tournament qualification round was stated on December 12, 2015 and culminated on December 27, 2015 across five zones – North Zone, South Zone, East Zone, West Zone and North East Zone – throughout the Nation.

The final match was played on 15 January 2016 02:30 PM IST at Railway Stadium, Jabalpur between Manipur and Railways. Railways defeated 18 times champions Manipur in the penalty shoot-out 4–2 after the score line was even 3–3 after extra time.

Format
Twenty Nine states have been divided into five zonal groups. Top two teams from each zone – North, South, East, West and North East—was progressed to the final stage of the competition.

Zonal Round

All times are Indian Standard Time (IST) – UTC+05:30.

North Zone
*All North Zone matches were played in Greater Noida, Uttar Pradesh between December 22nd to 27th, 2015.

Fixtures and results

South Zone
*All South Zone matches were played in Trichy, Tamil Nadu between December 19th to 27th, 2015.

Fixtures and Results

East Zone
*All East Zone matches were played in Nadia, West Bengal between December 21nd to 27th, 2015.

A

Fixtures and Results

B

Fixtures and Results

West Zone
*All West Zone matches were played in Jabalpur, Madhya Pradesh between December 12th to 19th, 2015.

Fixtures and results

North East Zone
*All North East Zone matches were played in Kokrajhar, Assam between December 18th to 23rd, 2015.

A

Fixtures and Results

B

Fixtures and Results

Final round

The final round of the 2015–16 Senior Women's National Football Championship was started on 2 January and culminated on 15 January 2016 with the final.

Semi-final Qualification

All times are Indian Standard Time (IST) – UTC+05:30.
*All Final Round matches was played in Jabalpur, Madhya Pradesh between January 2nd to 15th, 2016.

Group A

Fixtures and Results

Group B

Fixtures and Results

Bracket

Semi-finals
*Semi-finals were played on 13 January 2015.

Semi-final 1

Semi-final 2

Finals

References

External links
 21st Senior Women's National Football Championship
 Fixtures & Results
 21st Women Championship Final Round

2015–16 in Indian football
2015 in Indian women's sport
2015 domestic association football cups
2015–16 in Indian football leagues
Senior Women's National Football Championship